Meymeh is a city in Zarrinabad District, Dehloran County, Ilam Province, Iran. At the 2006 census, its population was 2,277, in 437 families.

Pahleh is populated by Kurds.

References

Populated places in Dehloran County

Cities in Ilam Province

Kurdish settlements in Ilam Province